Quothquan (also formerly spelled Couth-Boan, meaning "the beautiful hill"; , pronounced , meaning "the common") is a village in Libberton parish, South Lanarkshire, Scotland.

The other is a lower larger annexe to the northwest, with double ramparts and a medial ditch which has mostly been filled in.

Community facilities
Quothquan has a village hall near the remains of the graveyard and the ruins of a small church. The original church was recorded in use as a schoolroom after 1724. A new church in the village was paid for in 1903 by Glasgow shipowner Sir Nathaniel Dunlop, who lived nearby.

References

Villages in South Lanarkshire